Android 207 (2006) is a short stop motion-animated film. It was directed, produced, written and edited by Canadian filmmaker Paul Whittington.

Premise
A robot with human-like features finds himself in a vast labyrinth full of traps. As it tries to escape, it must face emotional and psychological challenges.

Release and awards
The film was first released in the United States at the Milwaukee Short Film Festival on 4 June 2006. On 28 September 2006 it was released in Canada at the Vancouver International Film Festival. In 2007, the film received the Best Film, Best Technical and People's Choice awards at the Vancouver Island Short Film Festival. It went on to be shown at international film festivals in Beloit, Arizona and Milwaukee.

References

External links

2006 short films
Canadian black-and-white films
Stop-motion animated short films
2006 animated films
2006 films
Canadian animated short films
2000s animated short films
Android (robot) films
2000s English-language films
2000s Canadian films